|}

The Buck House Novice Chase is a Grade 3 National Hunt novice chase in Ireland which is open to horses aged four years or older. It is run at Punchestown over a distance of about 2 miles and 2 furlongs (3,621 metres), and it is scheduled to take place each year in October.

The race was first run in 2005 and was awarded Grade 3 status in 2007.

Records
Leading jockey  (5 wins):
 Ruby Walsh – Coolgreaney (2007), Trafford Lad (2008), Alelchi Inois (2014), Three Stars (2016), Cadmium (2018) 

Leading trainer  (5 wins):
 Henry de Bromhead – Sizing Europe (2009), Loosen My Load (2010), Three Stars (2016), Jan Maat (2019), Zarkareva(2019)

Winners

See also 
 Horse racing in Ireland
 List of Irish National Hunt races

References
Racing Post:

Punchestown Racecourse
National Hunt chases
National Hunt races in Ireland
Recurring sporting events established in 2005
2005 establishments in Ireland